is a Japanese multinational video game publisher headquartered in Minato-ku, Tokyo. Its international branches, Bandai Namco Entertainment America and Bandai Namco Entertainment Europe, are respectively headquartered in Irvine, California and Lyon, France. It is a wholly-owned subsidiary of Bandai Namco Holdings, an entertainment conglomerate.

Bandai Namco Entertainment was formed on 31 March 2006, following a corporate merge between Namco and Bandai on 29 September of the previous year. Namco Bandai Games absorbed Banpresto's video game division in 2008 and dissolved Bandai Networks in 2009.

Development operations were spun off into a new company in 2012, Namco Bandai Studios (now called Bandai Namco Studios), to help create faster development time and tighter cohesion between development teams. Namco Bandai Games was renamed Bandai Namco Games in 2014 and again to Bandai Namco Entertainment a year later.

Bandai Namco Entertainment owns several multi-million video game franchises, including Pac-Man,  Tekken, Gundam, Soulcalibur, Tales, Ace Combat, Taiko no Tatsujin, The Idolmaster, and Dark Souls. Pac-Man, himself serves as the official mascot of the company.

As of March 2022, it is the third largest video game company in Japan in terms of revenue and market capitalization, after Sony Interactive Entertainment and Nintendo, ahead of Sega, Square Enix, Nexon, Capcom, and Konami.

The company also owns the licenses to several Japanese media franchises, such as Shonen Jump, Kamen Rider, Super Sentai, Sword Art Online, and the Ultra Series. It is the core publishing and development area of the Bandai Namco Group's "Content Strategic Business Unit" (Content SBU), and the main video game branch of Bandai Namco Holdings.

History
In February 2005, in the wake of their 50th anniversary, Namco announced their intent to merge with Bandai to form Bandai Namco Holdings. The merge was finalized on 25 September, creating the third-largest video game publisher in Japan by revenue. Bandai purchased Namco for US$1.7 billion, with Namco receiving 43 percent of shares and Bandai receiving the other 57 percent.

Both companies in a joint statement cited Japan's decreasing birth rates and advancements in technology as the reason for the merge, and to increase their relevance to newer audiences. Both companies worked independently under the newly formed Bandai Namco Holdings until March 31, 2006, when their video game operations were merged to form Namco Bandai Games. Earlier on 26 January, Namco Hometek and Bandai Games merged to form Namco Bandai Games America, the North American division.

On 1 April 2008, Banpresto's video game operations were absorbed by Namco Bandai Games. On 1 April 2009, Bandai Networks, Namco Bandai's mobile phone business, was dissolved and absorbed into Namco Bandai Games.

Just prior to the release of Afro Samurai at the end of 2008, the company announced the Surge publishing label. The new label was an attempt at creating a separate identity for the company, aimed at a Western audience desiring more mature themes in-game content. Following Afro, early press materials indicated that Dead to Rights: Retribution and Splatterhouse would also be released under the Surge label, but neither game ultimately did; both were released with a retro Namco label instead to reflect the series' legacy, the Surge branding would be phased out following the release of Afro Samurai.

In 2010, Namco Bandai Games entered the Guinness World Records as the company that released the most TV commercials for the same product, a Nintendo DS game called Solatorobo: Red the Hunter. They created 100 versions of the ad as the game consists of 100 chapters.

In early 2011, Namco Networks was absorbed into Namco Bandai Games America, effectively consolidating Namco Bandai's American console, handheld, and mobile video game development operations.

On 2 April 2012, Namco Bandai Games spun off its development operations into a new company called Namco Bandai Studios. The new company was spurred by Namco Bandai's interest in faster development times and tighter cohesion between disparate development teams. It comprises approximately 1,000 employees, who were already part of Namco Bandai.

In March 2013, Namco Bandai Games established two new game studios. The first, Namco Bandai Studios Singapore, is Namco Bandai's "leading development center" in Asia and develops game content for the Asia Pacific market. The second studio, Namco Bandai Studios Vancouver, works on online social games and game content development for North America and Europe, and is part of the Center for Digital Media (CDM). In July 2013, Namco Bandai Partners (NBP), which used to oversee the PAL distribution network since September 2012, merged with Namco Bandai Games Europe (NBGE) in order to push distribution and publishing into one entity, Namco Bandai Games Europe (NBGE), which is now known as Bandai Namco Entertainment Europe (BNEE). The Australian subsidiary of BNEE, Bandai Namco Entertainment Australia, aside from acting as the publisher and distributor for Bandai Namco titles in Australia, also publishes and distributes titles in the ANZ region for Square Enix and NIS America amongst others.

In 2014, Namco Bandai Games and Namco Bandai Studios became Bandai Namco Games and Bandai Namco Studios, respectively. The change unified the brand internationally in order to increase the "value" and "appeal" of the name. The full company name was changed to Bandai Namco Entertainment on 1 April 2015.

On 1 April 2018, the amusement machine business division of Bandai Namco Entertainment was transferred over to sister company Bandai Namco Amusement.

In September 2020, Bandai Namco Entertainment Europe and Oceania acquired Canadian video game developer Reflector Entertainment. The company acquired minority stake in Limbic Entertainment in February 2021 and became the majority stakeholder in October 2022.

In March 2021, Bandai Namco Amusement announced that withdrawal of the arcade game facility business in North America due to closure of various gaming facilities from the COVID-19 pandemic. Despite the announcement, Bandai Namco Amusement America was not affected by this withdrawal. In April 2021, Bandai Namco Entertainment America announced it would close its Santa Clara office and move to a new Southern California office.

In June 2022, Bandai Namco Entertainment and ILCA. Inc announced the establishment of Bandai Namco Aces, with 51% of the shares owned by Bandai Namco and 49% of the shares owned by ILCA. This new development company will be responsible for the development of AAA titles, including Ace Combat.

Corporate structure
Bandai Namco Entertainment was originally headquartered in Shinagawa, Tokyo, moving their operations to Minato-ku, Tokyo in February 2016. The North American and European divisions respectively in Santa Clara, California as Bandai Namco Entertainment America, and in Lyon, France as Bandai Namco Entertainment Europe. Divisions have also been established in mainland China, Hong Kong, and Taiwan. Most of the Non-American and Japanese divisions were formerly distribution arms of Atari until the company sold them off to Bandai Namco in July 2009 alongside their Distribution Partners unit, which was effectively renamed Namco Bandai Partners until being folded in 2013.

Bandai Namco Entertainment is the core development division of the Bandai Namco Group's "Content Strategic Business Unit" (Content SBU), and the main video game branch of Bandai Namco Holdings.

Software development and subsidiaries
The core video game development studio of Bandai Namco Entertainment is Bandai Namco Studios, established in April 2012 as a separate company — Bandai Namco Studios creates video games for home consoles, handheld systems, mobile devices and arcade hardware, while Bandai Namco Entertainment handles the managing, marketing and publishing of these products. Bandai Namco Studios also produces music and videos based on its properties and has development studios in the European, Asian, and Americas offices.

Bandai Namco Online was established in 2009 and is a subsidiary responsible for online in Bandai Namco Studios games, and also develop games focusing on online. B.B. Studio was formed in April 2011 from a merge between Banpresto and Bandai Entertainment Company (BEC), handling the development of the Super Robot Wars franchise and other video games based on Japanese licenses.

See also
 List of Bandai Namco video game franchises
 List of Bandai Namco video games

Notes

References

External links

 

Bandai Namco Holdings subsidiaries
Japanese brands
Japanese companies established in 2006
Multinational companies headquartered in Japan
Publishing companies established in 2006
Software companies based in Tokyo
Video game companies established in 2006
Video game companies of Japan
Video game development companies
Video game publishers